Yenish (French: Yeniche, German: Jenisch), is a variety of German spoken by the Yenish people, former nomads living mostly in Germany, Austria, Switzerland, Alsace and other parts of France.

Components 
Yenish has been documented since the 18th century. It is a jargon rather than an actual language; it consists of a significant number of unique specialized words, but does not have its own grammar or its own basic vocabulary. Yenish speakers generally speak their local German dialect, enriched by the Yenish vocabulary, which is derived in part from Rotwelsch, with influences from Yiddish, Romani, and other minority languages of the region.

The Yenish vocabulary contains many words of Romani and Yiddish (and through the latter route, Hebrew) origin; it also has many unusual metaphors and metonyms that replace the standard German words. The relationship between Yenish and standard German is comparable to the relationship between Cockney or Polari and standard English. Some original Yeniche words have become parts of standard German.

The Yenish were originally travelers, i.e. people with professions outside of mainstream society that required them to move from town to town, such as showpeople, tinkers, and door-to-door salesmen. Today, the Yenish jargon is only used in certain isolated locations, such as certain poor districts of Berlin, Münster, some Eifel villages, and  Luxembourg.

Individual variants of the Yenish language can be quite distinct, and have names of their own, such as Masematte, Lepper Talp, Heenese Vlek, and others.

See also 
 Lotegorisch

References

External links 
 Wittich, Engelbert, and Günther, L., Die jenische Sprache, 1914

Language varieties and styles
German language
German dialects
Languages of Germany
Languages of Switzerland
Languages of Austria
Languages of France
Languages of Italy
Yenish people